The Essex County Board of Education (ECBE) was a school district serving Essex County, Ontario, Canada, headquartered in Essex. In 1998 it was amalgamated with the Windsor Board of Education into the Greater Essex County District School Board.

Secondary schools
Source: 

Belle River District High School
Essex District High School
General Amherst High School
Harrow District High School
Kingsville District High School
Leamington District Secondary School
Sandwich Secondary School
Western Secondary School

References

External links
 Essex County Board of Education (Archive)

Former school districts in Ontario
Essex County, Ontario